Guess Who's Coming to Dinner is a reggae album and single by Black Uhuru. The album was first released under the title Showcase in 1979, then as a re-edition entitled Black Uhuru in 1980, with the addition of "Shine Eye Gal" (featuring a guest performance by Keith Richards on guitar), and with different mixes of the original LP tracks (some shorter, some longer.) The Guess Who's Coming to Dinner release, from 1983, is identical to the 1980 edition.

The album was listed in the 1999 book The Rough Guide: Reggae: 100 Essential CDs.

Track listing

Personnel
Black Uhuru
Michael Rose - vocals
Puma Jones - harmony vocals
Derrick "Duckie" Simpson - harmony vocals
The Revolutionaries 
Radcliffe "Dougie" Bryan - guitar
Robbie Shakespeare - bass
Sly Dunbar - drums
Keith Sterling - organ
Winston Wright - organ
with:
Keith Richards - guitar on "Shine Eye Gal"
Technical
Delroy Witter - producer on "Shine Eye Gal"
Sisan March - design
Deborah Feingold - photography

References

1980 albums
Black Uhuru albums
Albums produced by Sly and Robbie
Virgin Records albums